Ouled Hedadj is a town and commune in Boumerdès Province, Algeria. According to the 2008 census it has a population of 29,012.

History
 First Battle of the Issers (1837)

Notable people

References

Communes of Boumerdès Province
Cities in Algeria
Algeria